The Rushall Canal is a straight, narrow canal suitable for boats which are  wide, forming part of the Birmingham Canal Navigations (BCN) on the eastern side of Walsall, West Midlands, England.

Route
A short, non-navigable, arm at Longwood Junction leads to Hay Head Nature Reserve, which was once an area of limestone mines.

History
The canal was built in the, then, county of Staffordshire under an Act of Parliament of April 1844 (four years after the merger of the BCN and W&E) to connect the Daw End Branch to The Tame Valley Canal to take coal from Cannock mines to Birmingham and the Black Country. The engineer was James Walker. It was completed 1847.

Points of interest

See also

Canals of the United Kingdom
History of the British canal system

References

Birmingham Canal Navigations
Canals in the West Midlands (county)
Transport in Walsall
Canals opened in 1847
1847 establishments in England